Sultan Senior High School is a public high school in Sultan, Washington, United States. It is part of the Sultan School District.

References

External links 
 

High schools in Snohomish County, Washington
Public high schools in Washington (state)